Swen König (born 3 September 1985) is a retired Swiss football goalkeeper. He is currently the goalkeeper coach of Switzerland national football team.

König is a former youth international and was in the Swiss U-17 squad that won the 2002 U-17 European Championships.

Honours

International 
 UEFA U-17 European Champion: 2002

References

1985 births
Living people
Swiss men's footballers
Switzerland youth international footballers
FC Aarau players
FC Vaduz players
Swiss expatriate footballers
Swiss expatriate sportspeople in Liechtenstein
FC Wohlen players
Swiss expatriates in Liechtenstein
FC Luzern players
Expatriate footballers in Liechtenstein
Grasshopper Club Zürich players
AC Bellinzona players
Swiss Super League players
Swiss Challenge League players
Association football goalkeepers